2008 F.C. Gifu season

Competitions

Domestic results

J. League 2

Emperor's Cup

Player statistics

Other pages
 J. League official site

Gifu
2008